Kotiteollisuus is the self-titled album of the Finnish heavy metal band Kotiteollisuus, their 11th. Released on 2 March 2011, it debuted at number one on the Finnish Albums Chart.

"Soitellen sotaan" the first single from the album was prereleased on 24 January 2011.

Track listing
Hornankattila – 07:33 (Hell's Pot)
Soitellen sotaan – 04:11 (Bring a Knife to a Gunfight)
Raskaat veet – 04:01 (Heavy Waters)
Sarvet itää – 04:55 (Horns Sprout)
Kylmä teräs – 04:44 (Cold Steel)
Rosebud – 04:17
Ei kukaan – 05:29 (Nobody)
Isän kädestä – 04:33 (From the Hand of the Father)
Pahanilmanlinnut – 03:14 (Jinxes)
Itken seinään päin – 04:54 (I Cry Towards the Wall)
Ainoa – 05:02 (Only One)
Taivas on auki – 08:16 (Heaven Is Open)

Singles
"Soitellen sotaan" (Released 24 January 2011)

Chart performance

Personnel
Jouni Hynynen – guitars, vocals, backing vocals
Janne Hongisto – bass, backing vocals
Jari Sinkkonen – drums, backing vocals
Guest musicians
Ismo Alanko – cello (in "Ainoa")
Tuomas Holopainen –  keyboards ("Itken seinään päin")
Miitri Aaltonen – vocals
Antti Hyyrynen – backing vocals 
Janne Hynynen – vocals
Yari Knuutinen – string arrangements of songs ("Kylmä teräs" and "Taivas on auki")

References

2011 albums
Kotiteollisuus albums